George Carlyle Marler,  (September 14, 1901 – April 10, 1981) was a politician, notary and philatelist in Quebec, Canada.

Education
Born in Montreal, Quebec, Marler studied at Selwyn House School, Bishop's College School, Royal Naval College of Canada and McGill University, where he earned a bachelor of civil law degree.

City Councillor
Marler served as city councillor from 1940 to 1947 and as Deputy Chairman of Montreal Executive Committee in Montreal.

Member of the legislature
Marler successfully ran as a Liberal candidate in the provincial district of Westmount–Saint-Georges in a by-election held on March 23, 1942.  He was re-elected in the 1944, 1948 and 1952 elections.

Leader of the Opposition
In the 1948 election, Liberal Leader Adélard Godbout lost re-election in the district of L'Islet.  Marler took over as Leader of the Official Opposition.  Godbout resigned as Liberal Leader on July 22, 1949.  At the 1950 Quebec Liberal Party leadership convention, Marler declined nomination, and Georges-Émile Lapalme became the new party leader on May 20, 1950.  However, Lapalme failed to win a seat in the legislature in the 1952 election, so Marler continued as Leader of the Opposition until Lapalme won a by-election in 1953.

Member of the Federal Cabinet
Marler resigned from the legislature on June 30, 1954, and was appointed to the federal cabinet of Louis Saint-Laurent as minister of transport.  Later that year he won a by-election and became the Member of Pariliament for the federal district of Saint-Antoine—Westmount.  He was re-elected in the 1957, but was defeated in 1958.

Legislative Councillor
Marler was appointed Minister without Portfolio in the Cabinet of Jean Lesage in October 1960.  A month later, he was appointed to the Legislative Council of Quebec.

Death
Marler died on April 10, 1981, in Montreal.

Books
The Edward VII issue of Canada : a detailed study / by George C. Marler.  -- [Ottawa] : National Postal Museum, c1975.
The law of real property : Quebec / by William de Montmollin Marler ; completed and arranged by George C. Marler ; with a foreword by P.B. Mignault. -- Toronto : Burroughs, 1932.
Canada, the admiral issue, 1911-1925 / by George C. Marler. -- Toronto : Unitrade Press, 1980.
Canada : notes on the 1911-1925 issue. -- State College, Pa : American Philatelic Society, 1949.
Booklets of the admiral stamps of 1911 to 1925 / by George C. Marler ; editor R.J. Woolley. -- [Canada? : s.n., 1970?] ([Thornhill [Ont.] : J.F. Webb]).

Archives 
There is a George Carlyle Marler fonds at Library and Archives Canada.

See also
Politics of Quebec
Quebec general elections
List of Quebec leaders of the Opposition
Timeline of Quebec history
List of Bishop's College School alumni

References

External links 

Royal Philatelic Society of Canada

1901 births
1981 deaths
Canadian Ministers of Transport
Liberal Party of Canada MPs
Members of the House of Commons of Canada from Quebec
Quebec Liberal Party MLCs
Members of the King's Privy Council for Canada
Montreal city councillors
Bishop's College School alumni
Quebec Liberal Party MNAs
Quebec notaries
Canadian philatelists
McGill University Faculty of Law alumni